William F. Reineke (born October 9, 1954) is the Senator of the 26th district of the Ohio State Senate.  A member of the Reineke family that has owned the Reineke auto dealerships for decades, he made his first run for public office for state representative in 2014.  When incumbent Republican Rex Damschroder failed to qualify for the ballot in 2014, Reineke decided to run to replace him.  He won the primary election with 48% of the vote in a three way primary, including a win against Damschroder's wife. Reineke went on to win the general election with 58% of the vote.

Electoral history

Ohio House of Representatives

In his second term, Reineke worked as a member of the House Finance Committee to pass the two-year Ohio operating budget for fiscal years 2018-2019. One provision he supported as a part of HB 49 was to freeze Ohio's Medicaid expansion, preventing new enrollment in the program by low-income Ohioans. In 2017, Reineke was named as the Assistant Majority Whip. His support of small businesses and working families and leadership for his district were cited as reasons for his appointment to the position. With the ascent of Larry Householder as Speaker, Reineke was dropped from leadership.

In 2019, Ohio Governor Mike DeWine proposed a gas tax increase in the state's two-year transportation budget. Representative Reineke opposed HB 62 because of the gas tax increase. The tax increase passed despite the opposition from Reineke and other conservatives in the House and Senate.

2020 Ohio Senate Campaign

On April 9, 2019, Reineke announced he was running for the Ohio Senate seat that will be vacated by David Burke in late 2020.

Reineke's campaign has been endorsed by Congressman Jim Jordan, incumbent Senator Dave Burke, the Ohio Republican Party, and the Buckeye Firearms Association.

References

Links
Official campaign site

Republican Party members of the Ohio House of Representatives
People from Tiffin, Ohio
1954 births
Living people
21st-century American politicians
Morehead State University alumni
Republican Party Ohio state senators